The District Council of Gilbert was a local government area seated at Riverton in South Australia from 1866 to 1932.

History
The District Council of Gilbert was proclaimed on 5 July 1866. The inaugural councillors were Frederick Fleming, James Milne, James Kelly, James Shearer, and Edward Prescott.

On 12 May 1932, by promulgation of the Local Government Areas (Re-arrangement) Acts 1929 and 1931, Gilbert was amalgamated with the westerly-adjacent districts of Rhynie and Stockport to form the new District Council of Riverton.

Chairmen
 Edward Prescott (1866–?)
 John McInerney (1927–1932)

References

Gilbert
Gilbert, District Council of
Gilbert, District Council of